Ramon Artiaga Zamora (June 27, 1935 – August 26, 2007) was a Filipino film actor best known for his leading roles in local martial arts films and action movies of the 1970s. He was popularly dubbed as the "Bruce Lee of the Philippines".

Early career
Zamora was born in San Juan, Rizal. He began his entertainment career in 1953 as a stuntman and dancer for LVN Pictures. He persevered in the bodabil circuit, performing regularly at the Clover Theater and the Manila Grand Opera House. He also was a member of the Festival Dancers, a dance troupe which performed international tours regularly.

From his stage performances, he was contracted in 1969 to star as a mainstay of the ABS-CBN gag show Super Laff-In. Zamora's most popular stock character in the show was a military-clad figure that bore an unmistakable physical resemblance to Adolf Hitler, who spoke in bastardized German and spouted catchphrases such as "Isprakenheit". The role won him the "Best Actor Citizen's Award for Television".

Film star
When Super Laff-In's network ABS-CBN was closed upon the declaration of martial law in 1972, Zamora shifted gears and focused on a film career. He starred as the durable komiks character Pedro Penduko in the 1973 Celso Ad Castillo fantasy film Ang Mahiwagang Daigdig ni Pedro Penduko. The resulting success of the film boosted Zamora's popularity, and he soon became one of the top box-office draws in Philippine cinema in the 1970s.

Zamora was especially popular for a string of locally produced martial arts films that emerged following the international success of Bruce Lee. Patterning his film persona around a Bruce Lee-type with a comedic twist, Zamora starred in such films as Shadow of the Dragon (1973), Cobra at Lawin (1973), Game of Death (1974), Return of the Dragon (AKA Revenge of the Dragon) (1977), and Bruce Liit (1978).

In 1978, Zamora shared the top billing with actor Weng Weng in Chopsuey Meets Big Time Papa.

Then he played his villain role as Edu Manzano's right-hand man to Lito Lapid in an action packed film Hindi Palulupig (1989).

Later years
By the 1980s, Zamora's career as a leading man petered out, and he returned to guest-starring in television programs, often in his "Hitler" guise. He also portrayed character roles in films, including one in the 1994 update of the Pedro Penduko saga now starring Janno Gibbs, Ang Pagbabalik ni Pedro Penduko. At the time of his death from a heart attack in his Antipolo home, Zamora had completed one last film that had yet to be released, Ataul for Rent.
His remains is at Loyola Memorial Park In Marikina

Filmography

Film
The Pig Boss (1972)
Dobol Trobol (1973)
Ang Mahiwagang Daigdig ni Pedro Penduko (1973) - Pedro Penduko
Landas ng Hari (aka Way of the Dragon, 1973)
Shadow of the Dragon (1973)
The Game of Death! (1974)
Return of the Dragon (1974/I)
They Call Him Chop-suey (1975) - Chop-suey
Karunungang Itim (1976)
Peter Pandesal (1977) - Pete
The Interceptors (1977)
Dragon, Lizard, Boxer (1977)
Ang Hari at ang Alas (1978)
Bruce Liit (1978)
Ahas sa Pugad Lawin (1979)
Kodigo Penal: The Valderrama Case (1980)
Snake Dragon Connection (1980)
Ang Tapang para sa Lahat! (1982) - Joaquin
Dalmacio Armas (1983)
Porontoy (1983)
Death Raiders (1984)
Ninja Komisyon (1986)
Kontra Bandido (1986)
Amang Hustler (1987)
The Rookies and the Mighty Kids (1987)
Vengeance Squad (1987) - Special participation
Damong Makamandag (1988)
Lorenzo Ruiz: The Saint... A Filipino (1988)
Pepeng Kuryente: Man with a Thousand Volts (1988)
Me and Ninja Liit (1988) - Papang Sang
My Darling Domestic (Greyt Eskeyp) (1989)
Hindi Palulupig (1989) - Ramon
Dudurugin Kita ng Bala Ko (1991)
Juan Tamad at Mister Shooli: Mongolian Barbecue (1991) - Gen. Volkswagen
Eh, Kasi Bata (1992) - Frank Chavit
Aguinaldo (1993)
Duterte: Ang Berdugong Alkalde ng Davao (1997) - Ka Diony
Pedro Penduko, Episode II: The Return of the Comeback (2000) - Maguayen
Basta Tricycle Driver... Sweet Lover (2000)
Isang Lahi, Isang Dugo sa Lupang Pangako (2000) - Arula
Sgt. Isaias Marcos... Bawat Hakbang Panganib (2000)
Eksperto: Ako ang Sasagupa! (2000) - Mr. Lee Chang Loo
Eva, Lason kay Adan (2002)
Pistolero (2002)
Pelukang Itim: Agimat Ko Ito for Victory Again (2005)
Lisensyadong Kamao (2005) - Pedring
M.O.N.A.Y (Misteyks Obda Neyson Adres Yata) ni Mr. Shooli (2007)
Ataul: For Rent (2007) - Chairman Tando

Television
Super Laff-In (1970s) .... himself
Maging Sino Ka Man (2006) .... Simon
Da Adventures of Pedro Penduko (2006) .... Father Ben
Maalaala Mo Kaya: "Shades" .... Tatay Landro

Notes

References

External links

1935 births
2007 deaths
20th-century comedians
Filipino male comedians
Filipino television personalities
Male actors from Metro Manila
People from San Juan, Metro Manila